Agrigan is a small island off the southern coast of the island of Guam. It is connected to the mainland by the Merizo Barrier Reef.

References

Bendure, G. & Friary, N. (1988) Micronesia:A travel survival kit. South Yarra, VIC: Lonely Planet.

Geography of Guam
Islands of Guam